The Phantom Carriage or The Phantom Wagon (French: La charrette fantôme) is a 1939 French drama film directed by Julien Duvivier and starring Pierre Fresnay, Marie Bell and Micheline Francey. It is based on the novel Thy Soul Shall Bear Witness! by Selma Lagerlöf, which had previously been adapted into the 1921 Swedish silent film The Phantom Carriage by Victor Sjöström. 

It was shot at the Neuilly Studios in Paris. The film's sets were designed by the art director Jacques Krauss. It was due to be screened at the first Cannes Film Festival scheduled for September 1939, but cancelled due to the outbreak of the Second World War.

Plot summary

Cast

References

Bibliography 
 Goble, Alan. The Complete Index to Literary Sources in Film. Walter de Gruyter, 1999.

External links 
 
 
 
 

1930s French films
1930s French-language films
1939 drama films
1939 films
Films based on Swedish novels
Films based on works by Selma Lagerlöf
Films directed by Julien Duvivier
Films set around New Year
French drama films
Remakes of Swedish films